Fanny Horta (born 22 January 1986) is a rugby union player. She represented  at the 2006 Women's Rugby World Cup, and 2010 Women's Rugby World Cup. She captained France at the 2014 China Women's Sevens. She was selected as a member of France's women's national rugby sevens team to the 2016 Summer Olympics.

References

External links 
 
 
 
 

1986 births
Living people
French female rugby union players
Female rugby sevens players
Rugby sevens players at the 2016 Summer Olympics
Olympic rugby sevens players of France
France international rugby sevens players
Rugby sevens players at the 2020 Summer Olympics
Medalists at the 2020 Summer Olympics
Olympic silver medalists for France
Olympic medalists in rugby sevens
France international women's rugby sevens players